Computron may refer to:

 Computron (Transformers), a fictional character in the Transformers universe
 Computron tube, an electron tube computing device

See also
 Computon, a unit of computing power
 Computronium, a hypothetical substance